Point Douglas is a provincial electoral district in Winnipeg, Manitoba, Canada. It is named for a part of the city that is surrounded by a bend in the Red River. The riding covers the neighbourhoods of William Whyte, Dufferin Industrial, North Point Douglas, Lord Selkirk Park and South Point Douglas plus parts of St. John's Park, St. John's, Inkster-Faraday, Burrows Central, Robertson, Dufferin, Logan C.P.R., Civic Centre and the Exchange District.  It was also Winnipeg's only government supported red light district.

History

The division was created by redistribution for the 1969 provincial election, eliminated in 1978 into Burrows, Logan and St. Johns.  It was re-established in 1989 from parts of Burrows, Logan, St. Johns and a small part of Sevenoaks. It is located in north-central Winnipeg, and includes the Point Douglas neighbourhood.

Point Douglas is bordered to the east by St. Boniface and Elmwood, to the south by Logan, to the north by St. Johns, and to the west by Burrows, Wellington and Minto. Different parts of the division are included in the federal ridings of Winnipeg Centre and Winnipeg North.

Point Douglas is named after Thomas Douglas, the 5th Earl of Selkirk, who established the Red River Colony in 1812. His namesake, twentieth-century politician Tommy Douglas, also lived in the Point Douglas neighbourhood in the early 1910s.

The Manitoba New Democratic Party has won every election in the constituency.

Demographics

Source:  2003 CBC Profile

List of provincial representatives

Electoral history

1990 to present

 

^ Change is not based on redistributed results

^ Change is not based on redistributed results

1969 to 1981

All electoral information is taken from Elections Manitoba.  Expenditures refer to individual candidate expenses.

Previous boundaries

References

Manitoba provincial electoral districts
Politics of Winnipeg